Tanishpa’s dwarf gecko (Microgecko tanishpaensis) is a species of lizard in the family Gekkonidae. It is endemic to Pakistan.

References

Microgecko
Reptiles described in 2020
Reptiles of Pakistan